Kenneth H. McAlister (born April 15, 1960) is a former American football linebacker who played five seasons in the National Football League with the Seattle Seahawks, San Francisco 49ers and Kansas City Chiefs. He played college basketball at the University of San Francisco and attended Oakland High School in Oakland, California. He did not play college football and made the Seahawks roster in 1982.

References

External links
Just Sports Stats

Living people
1960 births
Players of American football from Oakland, California
American football linebackers
African-American players of American football
San Francisco Dons men's basketball players
Seattle Seahawks players
San Francisco 49ers players
Kansas City Chiefs players
Basketball players from Oakland, California
American men's basketball players
21st-century African-American people
20th-century African-American sportspeople